Moses Kilgore (March 19, 1817 – October 14, 1890) was an American businessman and politician.

Kilgore was born in Lovell, Maine. In 1852, he moved to Racine, Wisconsin. He then moved to Port Washington, Wisconsin and built a pier. In 1860, Kilgore moved to Baileys Harbor, Wisconsin where he built a pier and was in the ship building business. Kilgore was also a farmer and a merchant. In 1868, Kilgore served in the Wisconsin State Assembly and was a Democrat. Kilgore died at his home after not feeling very well.

Notes

External links

1817 births
1890 deaths
People from Lovell, Maine
People from Baileys Harbor, Wisconsin
Politicians from Racine, Wisconsin
People from Washington County, Wisconsin
American shipbuilders
Businesspeople from Wisconsin
Farmers from Wisconsin
People from Port Washington, Wisconsin
19th-century American politicians
Democratic Party members of the Wisconsin State Assembly